The Band of the Royal Irish Regiment is a military band serving as the regimental band for Royal Irish Regiment (established in 1992) and the chief Irish military reserve band in the British Army. Being a reserve band, with is composed of volunteer musicians with the exception of a permanent staff instructor.

History

Previous Irish military bands in the British Army

Ranger band
The Royal Irish Rangers band was established in 1968. It took part in the Edinburgh Military Tattoo in 1979. On 12 January 1991, all 19 members of the band led by bandmaster WO1 Clarke were deployed to a transit camp in Saudi Arabia where they joined a unit of the Royal Marines in Operation Desert Storm. On 19 January the band undertook a twelve-hour move towards the border with Iraq to reinforce the 32 Field Hospital, a unit consisting of 600 military personnel of the British Armed Forces. On St Patrick’s Day a parade was led by the band at the hospital.

UDR Pipes and Drums
Each battalion of the Ulster Defence Regiment had a section of professional bagpipers who were part of a formally pipe band (called the Pipes & Drums of the Ulster Defence Regiment). In June 1986, the regiment held a two-day military tattoo at Ravenhill rugby ground in Belfast. It attracted 12,000 residents of the city and the performance of a Beating Retreat by the Pipes and Drums and the Band of the Duke of Edinburgh's Royal Regiment and the Royal Ulster Constabulary Band. The only UDR recording ever publicly released was the 5 UDR Pipes & Drums performing "Irish & Scottish Pipe Music", which includes the regimental and battalion marches as well as other Irish tunes.

Today
The band in 1993, a year later after the regiment. It uniquely combined the bugles, pipes, and drums from both regiments. As a result, boasted the largest regimental musical ensemble in the British Army before being reorganized in October 2007. On 28 April 2012, a parade to a UDR memorial unveiled at the National Memorial Arboretum was led by the band. The band was present during the Rangers' golden jubilee in 2018. During the celebrations, the band performed a "beating retreat" in an event hosted by the Lisburn and Castlereagh City Council.

Uniform
Its uniform follows the traditional full dress uniform for of Irish regiments and rifle regiments. The pipers uniform consists of a saffron kilt, a bottle-green "Prince Charlie" jacket, cape and caubeen. Unlike other Irish regiments, UDR pipers did not wear a traditional hackle and the lining colour of the cloaks was unique to the regiment.

Regimental marches

Killaloe

Killaloe is the regimental march of The Royal Irish Regiment as well as the South African Irish Regiment. When playing the  On such occasions, at a time generally given by the Sergeant-Major, the Band would make a pause, during which all ranks would give a 'Connaught Yell!', then continue playing.

See also
Band and Bugles of The Rifles
British Columbia Regiment Band
Band of the Irish Guards
NYPD Pipes and Drums
Irish Defence Forces School of Music
British Army bands

References

Royal Irish Regiment (1992)
Military units and formations established in 1993
Musical groups established in 1993
1993 establishments in the United Kingdom